Joaquim Ferreira may refer to:
Joaquim Ferreira (rugby union) (born 1973), Portuguese rugby union footballer
Joaquim Ferreira (footballer), Portuguese association footballer active 1920–1933
Joaquim Ferreira (athlete) (born 1937), Portuguese middle-distance runner